Kenneth David Atkinson (born March 2, 1947) is a Canadian former politician.  He represented the federal riding of St. Catharines on behalf of the Progressive Conservative Party for one term, from 1988 to 1993.

He lost his seat to Liberal candidate Walt Lastewka in the 1993 federal election.

References

1947 births
Living people
Members of the House of Commons of Canada from Ontario
Politicians from St. Catharines
Progressive Conservative Party of Canada MPs